Esther Margaux Justiniano Uson, (born May 17) better known as Mocha Uson, is a controversial Filipino singer, actress, dancer, model, political blogger, and public official widely known for spreading fake news and disinformation. She is also a co-founder of the group Mocha Girls.

Uson served as a member of the Movie and Television Review and Classification Board (MTRCB) from January 2017 through her appointment as assistant secretary of the Presidential Communications Operations Office (PCOO) in May of the same year by Philippine president Rodrigo Duterte as a reward for her support in his presidential election campaign. She resigned from office on October 3, 2018, following a series of gaffes, though some insiders said she was dismissed by Malacañang. On September 30, 2019, it was announced that Duterte had appointed Uson as deputy executive director of the Overseas Workers Welfare Administration (OWWA), much to the outrage of Filipino netizens.

Consequent to her risqué performances with the Mocha Girls and revealing personal photographs, including articles she authored with sexual content, Uson gained notoriety. Her critics have also brought into question her administrative competence, having propagated fake news and misinformation via her eponymous blog while in office, earning her the pejorative title "Queen of Fake News" from them.

Early life and education
Mocha Uson was born in Dagupan, Pangasinan, Philippines. Her father, Oscar Uson, was a judge of the Regional Trial Court in Pangasinan who was assassinated in September 2002 in Asingan, Pangasinan. Her mother, Estrellita Uson, was a pediatrician in Dagupan and a breast cancer survivor. Due to her baby's dark complexion, Uson's mother was frequently gifted with mocha-flavored cakes and ice-cream as a filial or friendly joke, which inspired the child's nickname.

Mocha Uson graduated with a Bachelor of Science degree in Medical Technology from the University of Santo Tomas in 1998. She later enrolled at the university's Faculty of Medicine and Surgery in 1999, but left during her second year to pursue professional modeling and a song-and-dance career.

Musical and acting career

Music and dance

Uson started as a solo singer-dancer, performing in bars within Metro Manila. She became popular for her sexy image combined with on-stage antics that included lap dances. She also became the lead vocalist of a rock band, Mocha with Spin Art.

In 2006, Uson and her manager, Lord Byron Cristobal, held an audition that led to the formation of the Mocha Girls, together with Hershey Delas Alas, Bez Lacanlale, Grace Oracion and Heart de Guzman. The group's debut album, A Taste of Mocha, was released in 2006 by XAX Records. Their second album, Mocha, was released in 2007 by Viva Records. Their third album, Deliciosa, was released in 2008 also on Viva Records. Together, they performed in various venues throughout the Philippines, United States, Dubai, and Guam.

In 2010, Hershey Delas Alas, Bez Lacanlale, Grace Oracion, and Heart de Guzman were dismissed by their manager Lord Byron Cristobal for allegedly accepting drinks and mingling with male customers after a gig. Delas Alas, Lacanlale, Oracion and De Guzman later formed a splinter girl group called Girlz Ink.

The estrangement of her four original colleagues ushered further developments, such as a fourth album, Pinay Ako, released in 2012 by Bellhaus Entertainment. It furthered the Mocha Girls to tour various Philippine cities and overseas such as the United States, the United Kingdom, Canada, United Arab Emirates, Bahrain, Malaysia, Cambodia, Thailand, Hong Kong, and Singapore.

Film
In 2009, Uson made her film debut in Sumpa where she starred alongside Joross Gamboa. In 2011, she starred in the Filipino-Malaysian film Seksing Masahista. She also starred in the movies, So Much Pain So in Love (2011) and Butas 2 (2012). In 2013, she starred in a coming-of-age film, Mga Alaala ng Tag-ulan, alongside Akihiro Blanco.

Online presence

Blog

Uson is one of the most widely-read commentators in the Philippines. In her blog, she initially provided commentary and advice on varied issues of sexuality; and had hosted online video chats related to these.

During the 2016 Philippine presidential elections, Uson's blog posts began to shift towards politics. Her blog, hosted in a Facebook page, Mocha Uson Blog, reached over 5.3 million followers in December 2017, containing posts that actively supported President Rodrigo Duterte and his anti-drug campaign. Her blog also opposes much of the country's leading newsgroups, ABS-CBN, GMA Network, the Philippine Daily Inquirer, and Rappler, which she derided collectively as "Presstitutes" (a portmanteau of press and prostitute). She had also openly criticized Vice President Leni Robredo, Senators Leila de Lima and Antonio Trillanes, and the Liberal Party.

Twitter
Uson also has an active Twitter account. In the morning of March 9, 2017, her account was suspended. Twitter's conditions for account suspension may include engaging in the propagation of spam or abusive behavior, or a compromised account security. She went "live" thereafter to criticize supporters of the Liberal Party, who she claimed were responsible for jeopardizing her account. Her account was restored later that afternoon. On March 20, 2020, her Facebook account was suspended. In the wake of her account's suspension, the hashtag #MochaUsonIsOverParty became a top trending topic in the Philippines and worldwide on Twitter.

Facebook
Uson likewise maintains an active Facebook account. At around 8:00 pm on March 20, 2020, Facebook took down Uson's account following calls to mass report her for violation of Facebook's standards, specifically on propagating hate speech. Following this development, the hashtag #MochaUsonIsOverParty once again emerged as a top trending Philippine and worldwide topic.

Internet memes 
Uson is also known for having been part of a number of Internet memes well known among Filipino audiences, notably in one scene of the movie "Four Sisters and a Wedding" where she was dragged out of a restaurant by the hair in a catfight with the character played by Angel Locsin.

Criticisms and controversies
Uson used to host a radio commentary program which aired over DZRH. However, the program was suspended after the radio station received complaints from Uson's profane remarks against Vice President Leni Robredo.

She has also been called to resign her post or at least be removed from office with the #FireMocha trending in social media. There are also petitions for her to step down.

Fake news and misinformation
Uson has been widely criticized for constantly propagating fake news and misinformation on her Facebook page Mocha Uson Blog. For these she has been dubbed by her critics as the "Queen of Fake News".

Notable incidents include:

 A Facebook post calling for prayers for Filipino soldiers, accompanied by a photo of praying Honduran forces. In her defense, Uson contended that she never claimed that the photo was that of members of the Philippine Army, and that the photo was only used as a visual aid or "symbolism". 
 Uson posting a news report praising the DSWD under the Duterte Administration's system for packing 50,000 relief goods commenting "That's how much the Duterte Administration values the ordinary Filipino." In fact, the news report was published on October 1, 2015, before Duterte became president.
 Sharing the photo of a dead girl who was supposedly raped and murdered by Filipino drug addicts and asking why there was no outrage from the Commission on Human Rights. The photo was in fact from an incident in Brazil dated 2014. Uson later took down her post.
 Attacking the administration and students of St. Scholastica's College for committing "child abuse" in forcing the young students to attend anti-Ferdinand Marcos burial rallies. This turned out to be false as attendance by the students at the rallies were purely voluntary and done with the permission of their parents.
 Sharing an article about a decorated policeman who was slain by drug dealers and challenging Vice President Leni Robredo, senators Bam Aquino, Antonio Trillanes, and Risa Hontiveros about when they would visit the wake. It turns out that the article was printed a year before, making it impossible for the Vice President and Senators to attend the wake or funeral.
 In a commentary about the tax evasion case against the tobacco company Mighty Corp, she cited the 263rd article of the Philippine Constitution. The Philippine Constitution only has 18 articles.
 On October 23, 2017, after Marawi was declared "liberated" following the deaths of Maute and Hapilon, Uson posted an image of clean city streets, claiming that Duterte's government moved really fast and that "22 barangays were already cleaned". It turns out that the photo was from May 25, 2017 - just the third day of the Marawi siege.
 In November 2017 on the day after the ASEAN summit came to a close, Uson shared a post by RJ Nieto misquoting Canadian Prime Minister Justin Trudeau as saying "...Theoretically, it is impossible to get (the garbage) back... even if it originally came from Canada" in reference to trash shipped to the Philippines from Canada. In fact, Trudeau's actual quote was "Even though it originally came from Canada, we had legal barriers and restrictions that prevented us from being able to take it back. Those regulations and those impediments have now been addressed, so it is now theoretically possible to get it back.", which is the complete opposite of what Uson and Nieto shared.
 In January 2018, Uson lashed back at critics over the award for government service she received from the University of Santo Tomas Alumni Association, stating that the controversy was being used to cover up the issues over Dengvaxia in the Philippines, former Senator Franklin Drilon's receiving of funds from Janet Lim-Napoles and "most importantly", the continuing eruption of Mayon Volcano in Naga, Camarines Sur. However, Mayon Volcano is located in Albay Province in the Bicol Region. Netizens and celebrities reacted on Social Media on Uson's gaffe, flooding the Internet with memes over Uson's ignorance. Uson later apologized for her "tiny mistake", but continued to accuse critics of silence over the issues of Dengvaxia and the death of UST law student Atio Castillo from a fraternity hazing. The latter claim was also false as Castillo's death had drawn public outrage, rallies, and resurrected calls for stricter anti-hazing laws in the Philippines.
 On January 15, 2020, Uson falsely claimed that Vice President Leni Robredo only gave 5 pieces of pandesal (small bread buns) and a bottle of water to refugees from the 2020 Taal Volcano eruption, spent more on media coverage than Taal relief goods, and did a lot of photo ops before helping victims of the tragedy. In actuality, Robredo and her staff were able to distribute 2,101 food packs containing 1.5 kilos of rice, assorted canned goods, and two packs of noodles to residents in evacuation centers in the towns of Sta. Teresita, San Jose and Sto. Tomas, as well as 1,000 face masks to the evacuees through Robredo's Angat Buhay program. Robredo commented, "Parang masyado namang petty na pag-awayan pa namin iyong laman. Pero iyong pinakapunto ko: bakit hinahayaan natin na iyong nagpapakalat ng fake news, sinusuwelduhan pa ng pamahalaan?" (Isn't it really petty that we'd fight over the contents? But my main point is, why are we allowing a peddler of fake news to still receive a government salary?) Robredo added: "Pera natin ito. Hindi naman ito pera ng kung sinong government official. Pero para hayaan mo na pera natin iyong ginagamit para lasunin iyong isip ng ating mga kababayan, tingin ko malaking kasalanan iyon." (That's our money. This is not the money of some government official. But to allow our money to poison the thoughts of our country-mates, I think it's a big sin.) According to Robredo, Uson's lies were an insult to the volunteers who helped repack the donations.
 On April 2, 2020, Uson posted photos showing personal protective equipment that were supposedly bought by the government then distributed to health workers. It was revealed that one of the photos she used was from the SM Foundation. The photo was replaced one day later after netizens called her out.
 On August 5, 2021, the Manila City Public Information Office flagged a post on her blog that claimed that a photo of a large crowd that was waiting outside a shopping mall that was not observing social distancing in a time of COVID-19 was from the city. The photo was actually from Rizal Province.

Filipino senators have also criticized Uson for continuously spreading fake news. Senator Nancy Binay questioned Uson's role in the Presidential Communications Operations Office (PCOO), asking Secretary Martin Andanar: "How can you fight fake news kung may instances na nanggagaling mismo sa isang Asec yung fake news?" (when there are instances when the Assistant Secretary herself is the source of fake news?)

In September 2017, Senator Antonio Trillanes IV filed administrative and criminal complaints against Uson for spreading fake news that he owned offshore bank accounts and for other alleged unlawful acts committed by the official. The lawmaker also filed graft charges against Uson for allegedly using her position to propagate false information.

In April 2018, an administrative complaint was filed against Uson by Akbayan Youth before the Office of the Ombudsman over posting misleading content on her Facebook page, with the charges of grave misconduct, serious dishonesty and conduct prejudicial to the best interest of the service. Uson did not attempt to defend herself against the charges, but rather made a joke thanking the complainants for giving her the idea of starting her own coffee shop business which she would call "Fire Mocha Café", named after the hashtag #FireMocha used by the complainants.

In a 2016 interview with Ricky Lo for The Philippine Star, Uson was asked whether she sleeps soundly at night despite the "ruckus" created by her writings, and she stated, "Yes. I sleep soundly at night knowing that I am fighting for the right side. There is a war going on between good and evil. My mission is to separate truth from lies, light from darkness and good from evil."

Data research and analysis done by Philippine news website Rappler has shown that Uson has been peddling fake news and sharing posts from Philippine fake news websites multiple times.

"Pepe-dede-ralismo" controversy
In August 2018, after releasing a video that purported to explain the government's message favorable to federalism, Uson received a heap of criticism for its vulgarity and explicit sexual content. In the video, Uson urged her co-host Drew Olivar to do a raunchy dance touching his crotch and rubbing his chest while singing "I-pepe, i-pepe. I-dede, i-dede. I-pede, pede, pede, pederalismo." (Pussy it, pussy it, boobs it, boobs it. Fede it, fede, fede, federalism). After Olivar's dance, Uson called for applause (palakpakan tayo) during the video.

Days after describing Mocha Uson's inclusion in the federalism campaign as a "beautiful decision" and a "brilliant idea", then Senate President Koko Pimentel admitted to being wrong about Uson and described the video as "filthy" and that it opposed the message that the administration intended to convey.

Due to complaints, the Ombudsman of the Philippines Samuel Martires ordered Uson to submit comments explaining her Pepe-dede-ralismo dance campaign before his office, and clarified that even though Uson had recently resigned from her position at PCOO, she would still be held accountable for possible criminal and administrative proceedings.

Mockery of the deaf
In September 2018, Uson released another video in which her group mocked the language of the deaf. In the video, Uson's co-host blogger Drew Olivar pantomimed sign language with Uson commenting "Para kang unggoy diyan" (you're like a monkey there), all the while laughing. Netizens and deaf groups protested the video, with deaf people stating that it was degrading to their condition, especially coming an official from the government.

The Commission on Human Rights (CHR) investigated a complaint filed by the Philippine Federation of the Deaf, and described the video as "utterly appalling and unacceptable".

Under Republic Act 9442 (The Magna Carta for Disabled Persons, and for Other Purposes), the section Title 4 states prohibitions on Verbal, Non-verbal Ridicule and Vilification Against Persons with Disability.

Red-tagging and criminal and administrative complaints 
Uson has been criticized for red-tagging university students, Lumad educators, activists, and human rights workers.

In December 2020, human rights group Karapatan filed criminal and administrative complaints against Uson and other government officials for alleged violations of RA 9851 or the Philippine Act on Crimes Against International Humanitarian Law, Genocide, and Other Crimes Against Humanity. According to Karapatan, red-tagging activities by Uson fall under crimes against humanity of persecution.

Politics and activism

2016 presidential elections
Uson voiced strong support for then Davao City mayor Rodrigo Duterte during his successful 2016 presidential campaign.

During the campaign she got involved in a dispute with musician Jim Paredes, member of the OPM musical group APO Hiking Society. Paredes, a supporter of the Liberal Party with its standard-bearer, Senator Mar Roxas, alleged Duterte of human rights violations. She cited an interview she had with Paredes in 2012, relating that Paredes probed her with questions regarding her sexual orientation; and that he allegedly tried to "hit" on her Mocha Girls bandmate, Mae Dela Cerna, and herself as well. Paredes later responded in his official website, saying that he doesn't remember asking such questions to Uson, describing her allegations as "mere exaggeration", and explained further how she was "very candid, almost bragging" during the interview.

As part of Rodrigo Duterte's administration

After Rodrigo Duterte's election as president of the Philippines, Uson became more involved in politics and later became a part of Duterte's administration.

In April 2017, Uson was part of the president's official delegation during his state visits to Saudi Arabia, Bahrain and Qatar. According to a presidential spokesman, she has a large number of followers from overseas Filipino communities, especially in the Middle East, and was meant to boost morale and well-being of her followers.

MTRCB board
Executive Secretary Salvador Medialdea confirmed Uson's appointment in a text message to Rappler on Thursday, January 5, 2017. As member of the board, Uson's job was to be part of a sub-committee tasked to review movies, programs, or television shows for recommendations of disapproval. Her position at the MTRCB was set to expire on September 30, 2017, although she relinquished her post on May 8, 2017, following her appointment as assistant secretary of the PCOO.

PCOO assistant secretary
On May 8, 2017, President Rodrigo Duterte appointed Uson as assistant secretary of the PCOO. Uson will be handling the social media department of the PCOO.

In her official Facebook account on June 5, 2018, Kris Aquino again called out Mocha for spreading misinformation about her parents, the late former president Corazon Aquino, and slain former senator Ninoy Aquino.

On October 3, 2018, during a Senate budget hearing, Uson stated that she had resigned as PCOO assistant secretary in order for the PCOO's proposed 2019 budget to be passed.

Bureau of Customs
In early August 2016, after her exclusive interview with Bureau of Customs commissioner Nicanor Faeldon on her "Mocha Uson Blog", Uson was alleged to have been appointed by the Bureau of Customs (BOC) as a "social media consultant", but she later clarified through her Facebook page that she would not be holding an official position. She drew criticism from Filipino netizens who questioned Uson's qualifications for the job and promoted the Twitter hashtag #DutertePleaseAppointMe, citing how easy it is to secure a position under the Duterte administration. Some netizens, however, supported Uson and asked the public to give her a chance to prove her worth.

The Bureau of Customs issued an official denial on its Twitter account stating: "Commissioner Nicanor Faeldon will not appoint Mocha Uson as BOC Social Media Consultant but she can write articles about BOC on her blog." Faeldon's chief of staff also clarified that “No papers are being prepared. Commissioner Faeldon did not sign any paper regarding Mocha’s appointment.”

Following this, Uson responded to her critics through an official statement and television interview. She confirmed that she will not be holding an official position at the Bureau of Customs, but reiterated her intent to voluntarily help the Duterte administration through social media. She also urged critics to "make good use of [their] time" by volunteering to help underprivileged children at the Department of Social Welfare and Development.

Overseas Workers Welfare Administration
On September 30, 2019, a new list of presidential appointees from Malacañang revealed that Uson had been appointed as deputy executive director of the Overseas Workers Welfare Administration (OWWA). Uson said she would have more time to focus on Overseas Filipino Worker (OFW) needs, including the creation of a Department of OFWs.

Filipino netizens slammed the appointment by questioning Uson's competency and qualifications and called it "recycling of garbage" by the government, a waste of salary, a scam, and a disease among other things.

Mocha was heavily criticized for supposedly violating the ban on mass gatherings when she visited quarantined overseas Filipino workers (OFWs) in Lian, Batangas.

2022 elections
Uson supported the candidacy of Isko Moreno for the 2022 Philippine presidential election remarking that Moreno is like a younger version of outgoing President Duterte. Uson was also a nominee of the Mothers for Change Party-list (MOCHA Party-list) which took part in the House of Representatives elections. The group aims to represent mothers although Uson herself is not a mother.

Political stance

Reproductive Health Law
In May 2011, Uson, along with other pro-reproductive health advocates headed to the Batasang Pambansa Complex, the headquarters of the House of Representatives of the Philippines, to call for the passage of House Bill 4244, better known as the Reproductive Health Bill. She also expressed her support for effective sex education in schools. She then challenged the Catholic Church to excommunicate her for supporting the aforementioned bill.

Vice Presidency of Leni Robredo
On April 2, 2017, critics of Vice President Leni Robredo held a rally called "Palit Bise" calling for the legal removal of the vice president from the office. According to Uson, the movement aims to oust Robredo due to her alleged lack of support for the Duterte administration, either by means of impeachment or voluntary resignation.

Personal life
Uson is openly bisexual. She calls herself "an open-minded Catholic," but has suggested that the Catholic Bishops' Conference of the Philippines is the antichrist.

Discography

Studio albums
with Mocha Girls
A Taste of Mocha (2006; XAX Records)
Mocha (2007; Viva Records)
Deliciosa (2008; Viva Records)
Pinay Ako (2012; Bellhaus Entertainment)

Filmography

Television
Twin Hearts (GMA Network)
Umagang Kay Ganda
Wowowee
ASAP
Music Uplate Live
Cool Center
Everybody Hapi
Comedy Bar
P.O.5 (2010–2011; TV5)
Family Feud

Film

Other appearances
Good Times with Mo: The Podcast
Get It Straight with Daniel Razon

See also
 RJ Nieto
 Fake news in the Philippines

Notes

References

External links
 
 Mocha Uson Blog on Facebook

Living people
1978 births
Fake news
21st-century Filipino actresses
21st-century Filipino women singers
Filipino female dancers
Filipino film actresses
Filipino television actresses
Singers from Pangasinan
Filipino television personalities
Filipino bisexual people
Bisexual actresses
Bisexual dancers
Bisexual singers
LGBT models
Filipino LGBT singers
Bisexual women
University of Santo Tomas alumni
Filipino Internet celebrities
Duterte administration personnel
Filipino women bloggers